728 Leonisis is an asteroid of the Flora family, discovered by Austrian astronomer Johann Palisa on 16 February 1912 from Vienna.

There is some uncertainty as to its spectral class. It has been previously placed in the rare A and Ld classes. These are generally "stony" spectra, but with significant deviations from the usual S-type. The unusual spectrum brings Leonisis' membership in the Flora family into doubt.

Photometric observations of this asteroid from the Organ Mesa Observatory in Las Cruces, New Mexico, during 2010 gave a light curve with a period of 5.5783 ± 0.0002 hours and a brightness variation of 0.20 ± 0.04 magnitude.

References

External links
 
 

Flora asteroids
Leonisis
19120216
Leonisis